Susan Tatum Woodhouse (born August 7, 1958, Suffolk, Virginia), known by her pseudonym Liz Carlyle, is an American writer of romance novels since  1999, primarily of historical romances.

Biography

Personal life
Susan Tatum Woodhouse was born in 1958 in Suffolk, Virginia. She attended college on a Scripps Howard writing scholarship and majored in journalism. She is married to Edward Carlyle, and has two stepchildren.

Career
She spent much of her career working in human resources and labor relations in the chemical and automotive industries. She didn't begin writing until December 1996, when she was between jobs. She finished the novel within two months and attempted to find a publisher for it. Although that work did not sell, Pocket Books was interested in seeing more of her work. In 1998 they bought two novels from her, publishing the first, My False Heart, in 1999. In 2003, she contributed a novella to the anthology Big Guns, marking her first foray into contemporary romance.

Carlyle has been nominated for Romantic Times Reviewers' Choice Awards five times, winning in 1999 for My False Heart as well as having been nominated for a Romantic Times Career Achievement Award, and won a Romance Writers of America RITA Award in 2006 for Best Long Historical Romance (The Devil to Pay).  Several of her books have become USA Today bestsellers.

Books

Lorimer Family & Clan Cameron
My False Heart † (1999)  Elliott Armstrong, Lord Rannoch and Evangeline Stone
A Woman Scorned (2000) Jonet Cameron, Lady Mercer and Cole Amherst
A Woman of Virtue † (2001) Cecilia Lorimer, Lady Walrafen and David Braithwaite, Lord Delacourt
A Deal with the Devil † (2004)  Giles Lorimer, Lord Walrafen and Aubrey Montford
Wicked All Day (2009)  Zoe Armstrong and Stuart, Lord Mercer

Rutledge Family
Beauty Like the Night (2000)  Cam Rutledge and Helene de Severs
No True Gentleman † (2002) Max de Rohan and Catherine Rutledge Wodeway
The Devil You Know † (2003)  Randolph Bentley Rutledge and Frederica d'Avillez

MacLachlan Family and Friends
The Devil to Pay † (2005)  Aleric, Lord Devellyn, and Sidonie Saint-Goddard
One Little Sin (2005) Sir Alasdair MacLachlan and Esmee Hamilton
Two Little Lies (2005)  Quin Hewitt, Lord Wynwood and Viviana Alessandri
Three Little Secrets (2006)  Merrick MacLachlan and Madeline, Lady Besset
One Touch of Scandal (2010)  Adrian, Lord Ruthveyn and Grace Gauthier
The Bride Wore Scarlet (2011)  Anaïs de Rohan and Geoff Archard, Lord Bassett
The Bride Wore Pearls † (2012)  Lady Anisha Stafford and Rance Welham, Lord Lazonby
A Bride by Moonlight (2013) Lisette Colburne and Royden Napier, Baron Saint-Bryce
In Love With A Wicked Man (2013) Ned Quartermaine and Kate, Baroness d'Allenay
The Earl's Mistress (2014) Tony, Earl of Hepplewood and Isabella Aldridge

Neville Family and Friends
After Midnight (2006)  Martinique Neville and Justin, Lord St. Vrain (included in The School for Heiresses anthology; with Sabrina Jeffries, Julia London, and Renee Bernard)
Never Lie to a Lady † (2007) Stefan Northampton, Lord Nash and Xanthia Neville
Never Deceive a Duke † (2007) Gareth Lloyd, Duke of Warneham and Antonia, Duchess of Warneham
Never Romance a Rake † (2008) Kieran Neville, Lord Rothewell and Camille Marchand
Tempted All Night † (2009) Tristan Talbot, Lord Avoncliff and Lady Phaedra Northampton

Anthologies
Tea for Two (2002) (with Cathy Maxwell)
Big Guns Out of Uniform (2003) (with Nicole Camden and Sherrilyn Kenyon) (contemporary romance)
The One That Got Away (2004) (with Victoria Alexander, Eloisa James and Cathy Maxwell)
The School for Heiresses (2006) (with Renee Bernard, Sabrina Jeffries and Julia London)
 †: Features George Kemble

References

External links
Liz Carlyle Official Website

Living people
1958 births
American women writers
Writers from Virginia
Writers from North Carolina
American romantic fiction writers
RITA Award winners
People from Suffolk, Virginia
Women romantic fiction writers
21st-century American women
Writers of historical romances